Penny ante may refer to:

 penny ante, a poker term, see Glossary of poker terms
 penny ante (cards), a card game played for very low stakes
 penny ante, an American slang term, see List of American words not widely used in the United Kingdom
 Penny Ante, a retired pricing game from the game show The Price is Right
 Penny Ante, the B-17G captained by Jesse R. Pitts and covered in his book Return to Base
 Penny-Ante, book publisher 
 "Penny Ante", a song from the album Viewers Like You by Tilt